Romeo Pădureț (born 17 October 1974) is a Romanian former footballer who played as a midfielder and defender.

Honours
Sportul Studențesc București
Divizia B: 2000–01, 2003–04
FC Snagov
Divizia C: 2005–06, 2007–08

References

1974 births
Living people
Romanian footballers
Association football midfielders
Liga I players
Liga II players
FC Sportul Studențesc București players
FC Steaua București players
FC U Craiova 1948 players
ACF Gloria Bistrița players
AS Voința Snagov players
Footballers from Bucharest